Marc Christian Trasolini (born June 21, 1990) is a Canadian professional basketball player for the Ibaraki Robots in Japan. He played college basketball for Santa Clara.

Trasolini signed with the Ibaraki Robots on June 25, 2020.

Career statistics 

|-
| align="left" | 2017-18
| align="left" | Hokkaido
|56  ||38 ||26.5 ||.555  ||.418 || .815 || 7.4 ||1.9  ||1.5 ||1.3 || 19.0
|-
| align="left" | 2018-19
| align="left" | Hokkaido
|45  ||43 ||33.4 ||.438  ||.285 || .753 || 8.0 ||2.0  ||1.5 ||1.0 || 17.7
|-
|}

References

External links
Santa Clara Broncos bio

1990 births
Living people
Basketball players from Vancouver
Canadian expatriate basketball people in France
Canadian expatriate basketball people in Italy
Canadian expatriate basketball people in Japan
Canadian expatriate basketball people in the United States
Canadian men's basketball players
Canadian people of Italian descent
Italian men's basketball players
Levanga Hokkaido players
S.S. Felice Scandone players
Santa Clara Broncos men's basketball players
SLUC Nancy Basket players
Victoria Libertas Pallacanestro players
Power forwards (basketball)